24 City is a 2008 film directed and co-written by Chinese film-maker Jia Zhangke. The film follows three generations of characters in Chengdu (in the 1950s, the 1970s and the present) as a state-owned factory gives way to a modern apartment complex. The film was also known as The Story of 24 City during production.

Production 
The apartment complex featured in the film is an actual development (also called "24 City") built on the former site of an airplane engine manufacturing facility. Jia will also produce a documentary about the location.

The film's narrative style is described by critics as a blend of fictive and documentary story-telling, and it consists of authentic interviews and fictive scenes delivered by actors (but presented in a documentary format).

Release 
24 City made its debut shown in competition for the Palme d'Or at the 2008 Cannes Film Festival.  Film Comment, the official journal of the Film Society of Lincoln Center, listed the film at the end of 2008 as the second-best unreleased (without U.S. theatrical release) film of the year.

Reception 
On Rotten Tomatoes, the film holds a 89% approval rating based on 44 reviews, with an average score of 7.4/10. The consensus reads, "One of China's most talented directors blurs the lines between non-fiction, drama, and musical theater in this vivid portrait of a country in cultural flux." On Metacritic, the film has an average score of 75 out of 100, based on 11 reviews, indicating "generally favorable reviews".

The Hollywood Reporter called the film a "moving elegy to modern-day China" and said of the film's documentary strain that it "prevails to simple, yet emotionally reverberating effect".

Time also reviewed the film favorably: "the film interweaves the political overview — of a city institution being torn down to be replaced by commercial and residential buildings — with personal anecdotes that are poignant and charming."

Screen International states "the latest chapter in Jia Zhangke's chronicles of modern Chinese history is certain to reinforce the director's status as an international arthouse icon."

The New York Times film critic Manohla Dargis gave the film a rave and stated "...the often amazing and intricately structured '24 City,' the latest from the Chinese director Jia Zhang-ke...shot in digital so sharp it looks hyper-real and projected digitally, the movie takes as its point of departure the closing of a state-owned munitions factory in southwest China... Mr. Jia is one of the most original filmmakers working today, creating movies about a country that seems like a sequel."

Anthony Kaufman of IndieWire praised the film and states "Jia's masterful aesthetic remains consistent, mixing documentary and fiction with intriguing results."

J. Hoberman of the Village Voice described the film as "so meaningfully framed that it could have been shot by Andy Warhol or Chantal Akerman", and called the film as one of the stand-outs of this year's films in competition at the Cannes Film Festival.

References

External links
 
 
 24 City at 2008 Cannes Film Festival
 24 City at the Chinese Movie Database
 

2000s Mandarin-language films
Sichuanese-language films
2008 drama films
2008 films
Films set in the 1950s
Films set in the 1960s
Films set in the 1970s
Films set in Chengdu
Films directed by Jia Zhangke
Chinese drama films